Charles Michael Macdonell (born 23 February 1995) is an English cricketer who has played for Durham MCCU and Derbyshire. Primarily a right-handed batsman, he also bowls right arm off spin.

Education 
He was educated at Wellingborough School and studied Psychology at Durham University. In 2014 he attended the Darren Lehmann Cricket Academy in Adelaide, Australia.

Career 
Macdonell played minor counties cricket for Buckinghamshire, making his debut in 2014. Whilst playing for Durham MCCU, scored a record number of runs for them against first-class opposition, including 146 against Warwickshire at Edgbaston in 2015 and 109 vs Derbyshire, 91 vs Gloucestershire and 81 vs Durham, all in 2016. He was released from his contract with Derbyshire in order to pursue other career opportunities in March 2018.

References

Notes

1995 births
Living people
Alumni of Durham University
Buckinghamshire cricketers
Cricketers from Basingstoke
Derbyshire cricketers
Durham MCCU cricketers
English cricketers
People educated at Wellingborough School